George Quintus Shoch (January 6, 1859 – September 30, 1937) born in Philadelphia, was a Utility player for the Washington Nationals (1886–89), Milwaukee Brewers (1891), Baltimore Orioles (1892) and Brooklyn Grooms/Brooklyn Bridegrooms (1893–97).

In 11 seasons he played in 706 Games and had 2,536 at bats, 414 runs, 671 hits, 89 doubles, 28 triples, 10 home runs, 323 RBI, 138 stolen bases, 298 walks, .265 batting average, .355 On-base percentage, .334 Slugging percentage and 846 total bases.

Shoch died at the age of 78 in Philadelphia, where he was interred at Cedar Hill Cemetery.

Sources

External links

1859 births
1937 deaths
Baseball players from Philadelphia
19th-century baseball players
Washington Nationals (1886–1889) players
Milwaukee Brewers (AA) players
Baltimore Orioles (NL) players
Brooklyn Grooms players
Brooklyn Bridegrooms players
Major League Baseball shortstops
Major League Baseball right fielders
Major League Baseball second basemen
Wilmington Blue Hens players
Hartford Babies players
Hartford Dark Blues (minor league) players
Milwaukee Brewers (minor league) players
Milwaukee Creams players
Springfield Ponies players
Springfield Maroons players
Philadelphia Athletics (minor league) players
Harrisburg Ponies players
Hartford Indians players
Wooden Nutmegs players
Jersey City Skeeters players
Troy Trojans (minor league) players
Amsterdam-Gloversville-Johnstown Jags players
Binghamton Bingoes players